The cooperative movement in India plays a crucial role in the agricultural sector, banking and housing. Many cooperative societies, particularly in rural areas, increase political participation and are used as a stepping stone by aspiring politicians.

History 

In the initial stage co-operative movement in India stood up slowly .in 1904 British govt formed a co-operative rule on the basis of report given by Fredric Nicholson a British officer of Madras region . While the first co-operative society formed in Kaṇaginahāḷa of Gadaga district of Karnataka becoming the first co-operative of Asia. It was started by Siddanagauḍa Saṇṇa Rāmanagauḍa Pāṭīla.

Government initiative

Ministry of Co-operation 

National level Ministry of Co-operation was established to develop the co-operative societies in India to empower the small scale producers and entrepreneurs. Several states also have own state level Ministry of Co-operation and/or statutory boards to develop co-operatives in their respective states.

Legal framework 

Co-operative Societies Act (1912) provides the legal framework.

Policy and strategic intervention 

National Policy on Cooperatives was formulated in 2002 to develop the cooperative societies sector.

Agriculture 

The country has networks of cooperatives at the local, regional, state and national levels that assist in agricultural marketing. The commodities that are mostly handled are food grains, jute, cotton, sugar, milk, fruit and nuts. Support by the state government led to more than 25,000 cooperatives being set up by 1990s in Maharashtra.

Agri product marketing cooperatives 

As with sugar, cooperatives play a significant part in the overall marketing of fruit and vegetables in India. Since the 1980s, the amount of produce handled by Cooperative societies has increased exponentially. Common fruit and vegetables marketed by the societies include bananas, mangoes, grapes, onions and many others. ChangthangiPashmina which remained as the monopoly of few traders is also moving towards fairness in production and supply chains with source region Ladakh's cooperative Looms of Ladakh.

Dairy 

Dairy farming based on the Amul Pattern, with a single marketing cooperative, is India's largest self-sustaining industry and its largest rural employment provider. Successful implementation of the Amul model has made India the world's largest milk producer. Here small, marginal farmers with a couple or so heads of milch cattle queue up twice daily to pour milk from their small containers into the village union collection points. The milk after processing at the district unions is then marketed by the state cooperative federation nationally under the Amul brand name, India's largest food brand. With the Anand pattern three-fourths of the price paid by the mainly urban consumers goes into the hands of millions of small dairy farmers, who are the owners of the brand and the cooperative. The cooperative hires professionals for their expertise and skills and uses hi-tech research labs and modern processing plants & transport cold-chains, to ensure quality of their produce and value-add to the milk.

Sugar 

Most of the sugar production in India takes place at mills owned by local cooperative societies. The members of the society include all farmers, small and large, supplying sugarcane to the mill. Over the last fifty years, the local sugar mills have played a crucial part in encouraging political participation and as a stepping stone for aspiring politicians. This is particularly true in the state of Maharashtra where a large number of politicians belonging to the Congress party or NCP had ties to sugar cooperatives from their local area and has created a symbiotic relationship between the sugar factories and local politics. However, the policy of "profits for the company but losses to be borne by the government", has made a number of these operations inefficient.

Banking and rural credit

Cooperatives also play a great part in banking. Cooperative banks in India serve both the rural and urban societies. Just like the sugar companies, these institutions serve as the power base for local politicians.

Housing societies

Widely known as Cooperative Housing Societies, these housing alternatives are established to help people with limited income to construct houses at reasonable costs.

The function of housing cooperatives varies based on geographical and cultural context. Compared to Western and European understandings of housing cooperatives, that primarily views cooperatives as equating to collective ownership, India differs from these conceptions about how cooperative housing societies operate.

Mumbai and Chennai are two areas that set the present for cooperative movements in India, influencing development in other major cities such as New Delhi, Thiruvananthapuram, and Kolkata. Despite the cooperative success and influence of these cities' in other regions, Mumbai and Chennai differ from the cities of Maharashtra and Tamil Nadu, known as areas in India that demonstrate a long history of cooperative efforts.

Types of housing cooperatives 

There are three distinct types of housing cooperatives in India approved by each state, through the Cooperative Societies Act, based on the co-op housing objectives and functionality. The categories of cooperative housing are tenure, finance, and building co-operatives. The classifications of these cooperatives vary across states, and its approval is not exclusive to each state.

Ganapati (2008) defines these categories as the following:

"In Tenure co-operatives, members collectively own and manage housing, similar to co-operative housing in the Western countries. Finance co-operatives provide loans for new construction or housing repairs to members. Building co-operatives construct housing for their members, but they may also be involved in land development"

Multi State cooperative Society 
Any society that is formed with the object of the economic and social improvement of its members by way of self-help groups with mutual aid, but is registered in more than one state is known as Multi State Cooperative Society.

Khadi cooperatives 

As of 2009, there were 5,600 registered institutions and 30,138 Cooperative societies for Khadi which employs nearly 95 lakh (9.5 million) people. Khadi and Village Industries Commission uses government provided funds to implement its programs either directly - through its 29 state offices, by directly funding Khadi and Village institutions and co-operatives, or indirectly through 33 Khadi and Village Industries Boards, which are statutory bodies formed by the state governments within India, set up for the purpose of promoting Khadi and Village Industries in their respective states. The Khadi and Village Industries Boards, in turn, fund Khadi and Village Institutions/Co-operatives/Entrepreneurs.

Small and micro industries corporation

List Of major cooperative societies in India

Aavin

Aavin is a statutory corporation and the trademark of Tamil Nadu Co-operative Milk Producers' Federation Limited. Aavin procures milk, processes it and sells milk and milk products to consumers.

Amul

Amul cooperative from India is the world's largest producer of milk, this was the achievement of White Revolution in India, which was spurred by Amul. It is an Indian dairy cooperative society. Amul is located in Anand, Gujarat. Amul was established in 1946. Dr Verghese Kurien is known as the father of White Revolution. He was the chairman of GCMMF for more than 30 years. Gujarat Cooperative Milk Marketing Federation Ltd. (GCMMF) is the cooperative body which manages the brand of Amul. GCMMF is currently owned by apex body of 13 District Milk Unions, (3.6 million) milk producers in Gujarat, spread across 13,000 villages of Gujarat.

Karnataka Milk Federation

After Amul, Karnataka Milk Federation is the second 
largest milk co-operative in India. It is a federation of milk producers association working on cooperative principles. In 1974, KMF was founded as Karnataka Dairy Development Corporation (KDDC) to implement a dairy development project. This project was run by the World Bank. Procurement of milk is done from Primary Dairy Cooperative Societies (DCS) by Karnataka Milk Federation (KMF)  Karnataka Milk Federation (KMF) has 14 milk unions throughout the Karnataka State which procure and distribute milk to the consumers. The milk is marketed under the brand name Nandini.

Horticultural Producers’ Cooperative Marketing and Processing Society (HOPCOMS)

It is a farmers’ society founded in 1965.  HOPCOMS comes under the jurisdiction of the Department of horticulture, Government of Karnataka.It was founded with the objective of direct marketing of farm products.  HOPCOMS is headquartered in Bengaluru. HOPCOMS is spread across districts of Bangalore Rural, Bangalore Urban, Mysuru, Mandya, Chikkaballapura, Ramanagar of Karnataka. The operations of HOPCOMS are three-fold: distribution, storage and procurement.

Indian Coffee House 

It is run by a series of worker co-operative societies. It is a chain of restaurants. The India Coffee House chain was started by the Coffee Cess Committee in 1936, The idea of Coffee House was formed since native Indians were not allowed into Coffee Houses which were mainly allowed only for Europeans. The first outlet of Indian Coffee House was opened in Bombay. By 1940's there were 50 coffee houses across the country. To run the coffee houses in India, there are 13 co-operative societies.

Southern Green Farming And Marketing Multi State Cooperative Society Limited(Farmfed)

It is an Agriculture society founded in 2008. Operational area of these society is Kerala and Tamil Nadu. Society's mission is Socially, economically, and ecologically sustainable community development.  Society help the farmers to get a reasonable return for their efforts in the soil by making them aware of various advanced techniques and methods of cultivation without harming the fundamental being of nature.

Indian Farmers Fertiliser Cooperative (IFFCO)
It is headquartered in New Delhi. IFFCO is the biggest cooperative in the world by turnover on GDP per capita. It was founded on 3 November 1967 IFFCO is India's largest fertiliser manufacturer. IFFCO reaches  over 50 million Indian farmers, with around 35,000 member cooperatives.

See also 
 Ministry of Co-operation
 List of cooperatives in India
 List of co-operative federations
 Institute of Rural Management Anand

References

External links 

 India's National Policy on Cooperatives 2002

 JKPSC Assistant Registrar Cooperatives Book

India

Cooperativec
Ministry of Co-operation